Trimeresurus cantori, commonly known as Cantor's pit viper or Cantor's pitviper, is a species of venomous snake, a pit viper in the Subfamily Crotalinae of the family Viperidae. The species is endemic to the Nicobar Islands of India. It was named after Theodore Edward Cantor (1809-1860), a Danish naturalist serving as a surgeon with the East India Company in Calcutta. No subspecies are recognized as being valid.

Geographic range
Trimeresurus cantori is found in the Nicobar Islands (which are in the Bay of Bengal), India, and possibly in the Andaman Islands. The type locality given is "Nicobars".

Description

This species varies in pattern and color. Dorsally, it may be green, dark brown, or light brown. Green individuals may have yellow spots, and brown specimens may have darker spots. Running along each side of the head, below the eye and above the upper lip, is a cream-colored stripe. There is also a cream-colored stripe on the first row of dorsal scales on each side of the body. Ventrally, it is greenish or cream-colored, with some brown spots on the underside of the tail.

The weakly keeled dorsal scales are arranged in 27 to 31 rows at midbody. The ventrals number 174-184. The anal plate is entire, and the subcaudals, which are divided, number 55-76.

Habitat

Behavior
Trimeresurus cantori is nocturnal and will hunt near houses.

Diet
Trimeresurus cantori preys upon small mammals and birds.

Venom
The species T. cantori possesses a potent venom, and some of its bites to humans have resulted in fatalities.

Reproduction
T. cantori is viviparous.

References

Further reading

Blyth E (1846). "Notes on the Fauna of the Nicobar Islands". Journal of the Asiatic Society of Bengal 15: 367-379. (Trigonocephalus cantori, new species, p. 377).
Das I (1999). "Biogeography of the amphibians and reptiles of the Andaman and Nicobar Islands, India". pp. 43–77. In: Ota H (editor) (1999). Tropical Island Herpetofauna: Origin, Current Diversity, and Conservation. Amsterdam: Elsevier. 353 pp. .
Parkinson CL (1999). "Molecular systematics and biogeographical history of Pit Vipers as determined by mitochondrial ribosomal DNA sequences". Copeia 1999 (3): 576-586.

cantori
Reptiles described in 1846
Reptiles of India
Endemic fauna of the Nicobar Islands
Taxa named by Edward Blyth